Ocobamba (possibly from Quechua uqhu swamp, pampa a large plain, "swamp plain") is a  mountain in the Vilcabamba mountain range in the Andes of Peru. It is located in the Cusco Region, Anta Province, Limatambo District, and in the Urubamba Province, Ollantaytambo District. Ocobamba lies southwest of Mount Huayanay.

References

Mountains of Peru
Mountains of Cusco Region